The men's individual trampoline competition at the 2010 Asian Games in Guangzhou, China was held on 21 and 22 November 2010 at the Asian Games Town Gymnasium.

Schedule
All times are China Standard Time (UTC+08:00)

Results 
Legend
DNF — Did not finish

Qualification

Final

References

Results

External links
Official website

Trampoline Men